Tân Mỹ may refer to:

Tân Mỹ, An Giang, Vietnam
Tân Mỹ, Bắc Giang, Vietnam